Bidestan (also Romanized as Bīdestān and Bīdastān) is a village in Japelaq-e Gharbi Rural District, Japelaq District, Azna County, Lorestan Province, Iran. At the 2006 census, its population was 123, in 31 families.

References 

Towns and villages in Azna County